A dusty plasma is a plasma containing micrometer (10−6) to nanometer (10−9) sized particles suspended in it. Dust particles are charged and the plasma and particles behave as a plasma. Dust particles may form larger particles resulting in "grain plasmas". Due to the additional complexity of studying plasmas with charged dust particles, dusty plasmas are also known as complex plasmas.

Dusty plasmas are encountered in:

 Space plasmas
 The mesosphere of the Earth
 Specifically designed laboratory experiments

Dusty plasmas are interesting because the presence of particles significantly alters the charged particle equilibrium leading to different phenomena. It is a field of current research. Electrostatic coupling between the grains can vary over a wide range so that the states of the dusty plasma can change from weakly coupled (gaseous) to crystalline. Such plasmas are of interest as a non-Hamiltonian system of interacting particles and as a means to study generic fundamental physics of self-organization, pattern formation, phase transitions, and scaling.

Characteristics

The temperature of dust in a plasma may be quite different from its environment. For example:

The electric potential of dust particles is typically 1–10 V (positive or negative). The potential is usually negative because the electrons are more mobile than the ions. The physics is essentially that of a Langmuir probe that draws no net current, including formation of a Debye sheath with a thickness of a few times the Debye length. If the electrons charging the dust grains are relativistic, then the dust may charge to several kilovolts. Field electron emission, which tends to reduce the negative potential, can be important due to the small size of the particles. The photoelectric effect and the impact of positive ions may actually result in a positive potential of the dust particles.

Dynamics
Interest in the dynamics of charged dust in plasmas was amplified by the detection of spokes in the rings of Saturn.  The motion of solid particles in a plasma follows the following equation:

where terms are for the Lorentz force, the gravitational forces, forces due to radiation pressure, the drag forces and the thermophoretic force respectively.

The Lorentz force, the contributions from the electric and magnetic force, is given by:

where E is the electric field, v is the velocity and B is the magnetic field. 

This is given as:

The direction of the force vector,  is that of the incident radiation of photon flux .

For the drag force there are two major components of interest, those from positive ions-dust particle interactions, and neutral-dust particle interactions. Ion-dust interactions are further divided into three different interactions, through regular collisions, through Debye sheath modifications, and through coulomb collisions.

The thermophoretic force is the force that arises from the net temperature gradient that may be present in a plasma, and the subsequent pressure imbalance; causing more net momentum to be imparted from collisions from a specific direction.

Then depending in the size of the particle, there are four categories:
Small grains, where q/m ≈ , and plasma still plays a major role in the dynamics.
Large grains, where the electromagnetic term is negligible, and the particles are referred to as grains. Their motion is determined by gravity and viscosity.
Large solid bodies. In centimeter and meter-sized bodies, viscosity may cause significant perturbations that can change an orbit. In kilometer-sized (or more) bodies, gravity and inertia dominate the motion.

Laboratory dusty plasmas

Dusty plasmas are often studied in laboratory setups. The dust particles can be grown inside the plasma, or microparticles can be inserted. Usually, a low temperature plasma with a low degree of ionization is used. The microparticles then become the dominant component regarding the energy and momentum transport, and they can essentially be regarded as single-species system. This system can exist in all three classical phases, solid, liquid and gaseous, and can be used to study effects such as crystallization, wave and shock propagation, defect propagation, etc.

When particles of micrometer-size are used, it is possible to observe the individual particles. Their movement is slow enough to be able to be observed with ordinary cameras, and the kinetics of the system can be studied. However, for micrometer-sized particles, gravity is a dominant force that disturbs the system. Thus, experiments are sometimes performed under microgravity conditions during parabolic flights or on board a space station.

See also
 Padma Kant Shukla—coauthor of Introduction to Dusty Plasma Physics
 Heremba Bailung

Notes

External links 

 Forschungsgruppe komplexe Plasmen - DLR Oberpfaffenhofen

References

 Dusty Plasmas: Physics, Chemistry and Technological Impacts in Plasma Processing, John Wiley & Sons Ltd.
 Merlino, Robert L., "Experimental Investigations of Dusty Plasmas" (2005) (PDF preprint); highlights some of the history of laboratory experiments in dusty plasmas,
 Morfill, Gregor E. and Ivlev, Alexei V., "Complex plasmas: An interdisciplinary research field", Rev. Mod. Phys. 81, 1353 (2009)

Plasma physics
Astrophysics